Aptesis is a genus of parasitoid wasps belonging to the family Ichneumonidae. The genus was first described by Förster in 1850 and has almost cosmopolitan distribution.

Select species 
About 74 species are described:

 Aptesis acuminata (Kriechbaumer, 1899)
 Aptesis albibasalis (Uchida, 1930)
 Aptesis albidipes (Walker, 1874)
 Aptesis albifrons Townes, 1962
 Aptesis alpestris Townes, 1962
 Aptesis alpicola (Habermehl, 1935)
 Aptesis alpineti (Roman, 1913)
 Aptesis anaulus Townes, 1962
 Aptesis assimilis (Gravenhorst, 1829)
 Aptesis atrox Townes, 1962
 Aptesis breviaria Townes, 1962
 Aptesis catulus Townes, 1962
 Aptesis chosensis (Uchida, 1931)
 Aptesis concolor Ruthe, 1859
 Aptesis contigua (Roman, 1909)
 Aptesis corniculata Sheng, 2003
 Aptesis cretata (Gravenhorst, 1829)
 Aptesis elongata Li & Sheng, 2013
 Aptesis erratica (Holmgren, 1869)
 Aptesis exannulata (Strobl, 1901)
 Aptesis exquisita (Schmiedeknecht, 1905)
 Aptesis fastigata Townes, 1962
 Aptesis femoralis (Thomson, 1883)
 Aptesis flagitator (Rossi, 1794)
 Aptesis flavifaciator Aubert, 1968
 Aptesis flavitrochanterus Watanabe & Taniwaki, 2018
 Aptesis fuscitibia Townes, 1962
 Aptesis gracilis Townes, 1962
 Aptesis grandis Sheng, 1998
 Aptesis gravipes (Gravenhorst, 1829)
 Aptesis habermehli Sawoniewicz, 2003
 Aptesis hannibal (Smits van Burgst, 1913)
 Aptesis hypocrita (Cameron, 1897)
 Aptesis improba (Gravenhorst, 1829)
 Aptesis incompta Townes, 1962
 Aptesis inculta Townes, 1962
 Aptesis jejunator (Gravenhorst, 1807)
 Aptesis latiannulata (Cameron, 1904)
 Aptesis leucotarsus (Gravenhorst, 1829)
 Aptesis lissopleuris Townes, 1962
 Aptesis melana Li & Sheng, 2013
 Aptesis messor Jonaitis, 1981
 Aptesis minutor Aubert, 1968
 Aptesis nigricollis (Thomson, 1883)
 Aptesis nigricoxa Li & Sheng, 2013
 Aptesis nigritula (Thomson, 1885)
 Aptesis nigrocincta (Gravenhorst, 1815)
 Aptesis nordlandiae (Strand, 1913)
 Aptesis ochrostoma (Thomson, 1897)
 Aptesis opaca (Cushman, 1937)
 Aptesis opposita (Kriechbaumer, 1902)
 Aptesis orbitalis (Thomson, 1883)
 Aptesis pallidinervis (Cameron, 1904)
 Aptesis pectoralis (Thomson, 1888)
 Aptesis perversa (Kriechbaumer, 1893)
 Aptesis plana (Kriechbaumer, 1893)
 Aptesis polita Bauer, 1985
 Aptesis pugnax (Hartig, 1838)
 Aptesis pulchripes (Cameron, 1903)
 Aptesis punjabensis (Gupta, 1955)
 Aptesis rufifemur (Kiss, 1924)
 Aptesis rufigastra (Tosquinet, 1896)
 Aptesis scabra Townes, 1962
 Aptesis scotica (Marshall, 1868)
 Aptesis scutellator Aubert, 1968
 Aptesis segnis (Provancher, 1877)
 Aptesis senicula (Kriechbaumer, 1893)
 Aptesis silvatica (Habermehl, 1935)
 Aptesis subguttata (Gravenhorst, 1829)
 Aptesis subnigrocinctus Jonaitis, 1981
 Aptesis terminata (Gravenhorst, 1829)
 Aptesis varia (Pfankuch, 1921)
 Aptesis verrucata Townes, 1962
 Aptesis yosemite Townes, 1962

References

Ichneumonidae
Ichneumonidae genera